Belgium is a sovereign state in Western Europe bordered by France, the Netherlands, Germany, Luxembourg, and the North Sea. Straddling the cultural boundary between Germanic and Latin Europe, Belgium is home to two main linguistic groups: the Dutch-speaking, mostly Flemish community, which constitutes about 59% of the population, and the French-speaking, mostly Walloon population, which comprises 41% of all Belgians. Additionally, there is a small group of German-speakers who live in the East Cantons located around the High Fens area, and bordering Germany.

Belgium's strongly globalized economy and its transport infrastructure are integrated with the rest of Europe. Its location at the heart of a highly industrialized region helped make it the world's 15th largest trading nation in 2007. The economy is characterized by a highly productive work force, high GNP and high exports per capita. Belgium's main imports are raw materials, machinery and equipment, chemicals, raw diamonds, pharmaceuticals, foodstuffs, transportation equipment, and oil products. Its main exports are machinery and equipment, chemicals, finished diamonds, metals and metal products, and foodstuffs.

For further information on the types of business entities in this country and their abbreviations, see "Business entities in Belgium".

Largest firms 

This list shows firms in the Fortune Global 500, which ranks firms by total revenues reported before 31 March 2017. Only the top five firms (if available) are included as a sample.

Notable firms 
This list includes notable companies with primary headquarters located in the country. The industry and sector follow the Industry Classification Benchmark taxonomy. Organizations which have ceased operations are included and noted as defunct.

See also 
List of largest companies in Belgium
List of Belgium-related topics
 List of airlines of Belgium
 List of Belgian banks

References

External links 
 Economic section on the web site of the Embassy of Belgium in the United States of America

 
Belgium